The Malaysia University of Science and Technology (MUST) was established in January 1997 when, then Prime Minister, Mahathir Mohamad and a delegation from Malaysia made a working visit to Massachusetts Institute of Technology (MIT) and endorsed the establishment of a university modeled after MIT.(MUST) is known for its focus on science, technology, and engineering education.

MUST offers undergraduate and postgraduate degree programs in various fields, including engineering, computer science, business, and law.

Faculties
 School of Business
 School of Science and Engineering
 School of Pre-University Studies

Collaboration

Universities
 University of Tasmania (UTAS)
 Rotterdam Mainport University of Applied Sciences
 Swinburne University of Technology, Australia

Industries
The collaboration between MUST and Federation of Malaysian Forwarders (FMFF) sees a tie up extending to about 2000 of its member companies

References

Universities and colleges in Selangor
Educational institutions established in 1997
1997 establishments in Malaysia
Private universities and colleges in Malaysia